The 2020-21 Michigan Tech Huskies men's ice hockey season was the 100th season of play for the program and the 59th in the WCHA conference. The Huskies represented Michigan Technological University and were coached by Joe Shawhan, in his 4th season.

Season
As a result of the ongoing COVID-19 pandemic the entire college ice hockey season was delayed. Because the NCAA had previously announced that all winter sports athletes would retain whatever eligibility they possessed through at least the following year, none of Michigan Tech's players would lose a season of play. However, the NCAA also approved a change in its transfer regulations that would allow players to transfer and play immediately rather than having to sit out a season, as the rules previously required.

Michigan Tech got off to a bumpy start but quickly recovered and pulled themselves into the top-20 by late January. As sophomore netminder Blake Pietila was establishing himself as the team's starter, the Huskies were able to play a majority of their games without interruptions from COVID-19. Tech lost its ranking after getting swept at the end of the month but then reeled off seven consecutive wins. The only downside was that their opponents in six of those games were some of the worse teams in college hockey in 2021, so MTU could only get up to 18th in the rankings. When they did play good teams, the Huskies were able to compete on defense but the scoring was reduced to a paltry amount. In their final 8 games against teams that were in the top-20 at some point, MTU scored more than 1 goal twice and lost all but one contest. As a result of their failures against good teams, the Huskies had only a slim chance to make the NCAA Tournament without a WCHA championship. Being swept in the quarterfinals effectively ended the Huskies' campaign.

Cayden Bailey, Jed Pietila and Marcus Russell sat out the season.

Departures

Recruiting

Roster
As of January 20, 2021.

Standings

Schedule and Results

|-
!colspan=12 style=";" | Regular Season

|-
!colspan=12 style=";" |

Scoring statistics

Goaltending statistics

Rankings

USCHO did not release a poll in week 20.

Awards and honors

Players drafted into the NHL

2021 NHL Entry Draft

† incoming freshman

References

Michigan Tech Huskies men's ice hockey seasons
Michigan Tech Huskies
Michigan Tech Huskies
Michigan Tech Huskies
Michigan Tech Huskies
Michigan Tech Huskies